Funkcronomicon is a 1995 various artists collection of tracks produced by Bill Laswell under the name Axiom Funk, after Laswell's associated record label. It is a 2-CD set that was released by Island Records. Funkcronomicon features heavy participation from various members of Parliament-Funkadelic, to the degree that Funkcronomicon is widely considered to be a full-fledged P-Funk album. The album features what may be Pedro Bell's last authentic artistic renderings, as well as P-Funk guitarist Eddie Hazel's last recordings before his death in 1992. The album comprises newly recorded tracks, as well as tracks that have been featured on other Bill Laswell productions. Produced and compiled at Greenpoint Studio in the Greenpoint neighborhood of Brooklyn, New York, Funkcronomicon contains songs that were recorded as early as Maceo Parker's For All the Kings Men (1989) period. The album title is a play on Necronomicon, a fictional book.

Track listing
Disc one
Order Within The Universe (written by Bernie Worrell, Bill Laswell)  3:17
Under The Influence (Jes Grew) (written by George Clinton, B Laswell, B Collins, Sly Dunbar, Robbie Shakespeare)  5:45
If 6 Was 9 (written by Jimi Hendrix)  6:00
Orbitron Attack (written by Grace Cook [a pseudonym for Eddie Hazel])  12:29
Cosmic Slop (written by G Clinton, B Worrell)  5:15
Free-Bass (Godzillatron Cush) (written by B Laswell, B Collins, Dennis Weeden)  5:43
Tell The World (written by B Collins, Maceo Parker, Sylvester Stewart)  3:53
Pray My Soul (written by G Cook)  5:08

Disc two
Hideous Mutant Freekz (written by G Clinton, B Collins, B Worrell, B Laswell)  7:25
Sax Machine (written by B Collins, M Parker, Bobby Byrd)  7:47
Animal Behavior (written by B Laswell, B Collins, Buckethead)  7:09
Trumpets And Violins, Violins (written by J Hendrix)  3:38
Telling Time (written by Nicky Skopelitis)  4:57
Jungle Free-Bass (written by B Laswell, B Collins)  5:38
Blackout (written by DeWayne "Blackbyrd" McKnight)  3:44
Sacred To The Pain (written by G Cook, Umar Bin Hassan)  4:54

Personnel

Producer: Bill Laswell

"Order Within The Universe"

Organ: Bernie Worrell
Turntable: DXT
Bass, Beats, Sound EFX: Bill Laswell

"Under The Influence"'Vocals: George Clinton, Gary Cooper, Bootsy Collins, Michael Payne, Debra Barsha, Zhana Saunders
Guitar: Bootsy Collins
Piano: Herbie Hancock
Bass: Robbie Shakespeare
Drums: Anton Fier
Drum Programming: Sly Dunbar
Congas: Daniel Ponce
Cowbell, Percussion: Aïyb Dieng
Tuba: Edwin Rodriguez
Baritone Horn, Euphonium: Joe Daly
Trumpet, Flugelhorn: Ted Daniel
Bassoon: Janet Grice
Tenor Saxophone, Flute: J.D. Parron
Horns arranged: Henry Threadgill

"If 6 Was 9"

Lead Vocals, Space Bass: Bootsy Collins
Guitar: DeWayne "Blackbyrd" McKnight, Nicky Skopelitis
Backwards Guitar: Robert Musso
Intro Guitar: Buckethead
Violin: Lili Haydn

"Orbitron Attack"

Guitar: Eddie Hazel
Space Bass: Bootsy Collins
Organ: Bernie Worrell
Drums: Jerome "Bigfoot" Brailey

"Cosmic Slop"

Vocals: Garry Shider, Gary "Mudbone" Cooper
Guitar: Garry Shider, Bootsy Collins, Michael Hampton
Organ: Bernie Worrell
Fairlight: Nicky Skopelitis
Bass: Robbie Shakespeare
Drums: Sly Dunbar
Congas: Aïyb Dieng
Material Strings Arranger & Conductor: Karl Berger

"Free-Bass"

Free-Bass: Zillatron (Bootsy Collins)
Stun Guitar: Menace (the Dawg of the C)

"Tell The World"

Vocals: Maceo Parker, Bobby Byrd, Godmoma
Keyboards, Voice: Sly Stone
Other Music: Bootsy Collins

"Pray My Soul"

Guitar: Eddie Hazel
Organ: Bernie Worrell

"Hideous Mutant Freekz"

Vocals: George Clinton, Garry Shider, Gary "Mudbone" Cooper, Bootsy Collins
Guitar, Space Bass: Bootsy Collins
Guitar Solo: Buckethead
Synth: Bernie Worrell
Drum Loops: Anton Fier

"Sax Machine"

Vocals: Maceo Parker, Bobby Byrd, Bootsy Collins
Alto Saxophone: Maceo Parker
Trombone: Fred Wesley
Guitar, Bass: Bootsy Collins
Low Bass: Bill Laswell
Synth: Bernie Worrell
Percussion: Timothy "T-Bone" David

"Animal Behavior"

Lead Vocals, Space Bass: Bootsy Collins
Organ: Bernie Worrell
Guitar: Buckethead
Turntables: Af Next Man Flip
Drums: Brain
Samples: Bill Laswell

"Trumpets and Violins, Violins"

Voice: Abiodun Oyewole
Guitar: Blackbyrd McKnight, Nicky Skopelitis, Robert Musso
Processing: Robert Musso
Intro Guitar: Buckethead
Violin: Lili Haydn

"Telling Time"

6 & 12 String Guitars: Nicky Skopelitis
Organ: Amina Claudine Myers
Bass: Bill Laswell
Drums: Joseph "Zigaboo" Modeliste
Congas: Guilherme Franco

"Jungle Free-Bass"

Jungle Bass: Bootsy Collins
Dub Bass: Bill Laswell
Vocal Sounds: Torture

"Blackout"

Guitar, Bass, Drums: Blackbyrd McKnight
 
"Sacred To The Pain"

Guitar: Eddie Hazel
Organ: Bernie Worrell
Voice: Umar Bin Hassan

References

External links
 Funkcronomicon at Discogs
 Funkcronomicon at Bandcamp
 Funkcronomicon at The Motherpage
 Sly, Miles and Jimi: The Album at The Independent''

P-Funk albums
Albums produced by Bill Laswell
1995 compilation albums
Island Records compilation albums
Axiom (record label) compilation albums
Albums with cover art by Pedro Bell